The Kjellman LMG was a machine gun produced in Sweden. It is notable for being one of the first fully automatic weapons ever conceived (if not produced) and one of the first light machine guns as well.

Although the patent dated back to 1870, and prototypes may have existed at least a half a decade before the Maxim was invented, black powder ammunition made the weapon virtually unusable due to rapid residue build up. The weapon was the brainchild of a Lieutenant D.H. Friberg, and was later modified by (and acquired its namesake from) Rudolf Henrik Kjellman, who in 1907, adapted the system to fire smokeless cartridges. Although boasting a reliable and secure breech-locking mechanism (similar to the Russian DP-27), the weapon was prohibitively expensive to manufacture, and only ten were ever made.

External Image
 Kjellman LMG

External links
 http://www.gotavapen.se/index_english.htm
 http://www.gotavapen.se/gota/artiklar/kg/swedish_kg1.htm
 http://peashooter85.tumblr.com/post/108124336697/the-first-true-machine-gun-the-kjellman-light

Machine guns of Sweden
Early machine guns
Light machine guns